DeSoto National Wildlife Refuge, created in 1958, is located along the banks of the Missouri River in the U.S. states of Iowa and Nebraska. The  refuge (46% in Iowa, 54% in Nebraska) preserves an area that would have been otherwise lost to cultivation. In 1960, an Army Corps of Engineers channelization project on the Missouri River moved the main river channel in the area to the west. The former river channel became DeSoto Lake, a seven-mile long oxbow lake.  As a result, part of the Nebraska portion of the refuge lies on the east side of the Missouri River.

For over 20 years after construction, the lake was used for recreational boating, with half of the lake designated for watersports and the other half a no-wake zone for wildlife habitat and fishing. The lake was so popular that access was limited by the park's rangers to keep the boat traffic down on the lake on Saturday and Sunday afternoons. The lake's marina, snack bar, swimming area and boat ramps were all removed, and restrictions were placed on boat operation.

Today, the refuge is home to around 30 mammal species, including white-tailed deer, beavers, opossums, raccoons, fox squirrels, muskrats and coyotes. Many bird species also inhabit the refuge, such as bald eagles, great blue herons, egrets, pelicans, turkeys and cardinals. The refuge is also a major stopover on the Central Flyway bird migration route; the population of migratory birds increases substantially in the spring and fall months. The numbers of snow geese used to frequently be in the hundreds of thousands, but for unknown reasons has substantially dropped for only a few thousand a year (not at once). The population of Canada geese that stopped at the lake before it was channelized is once again rising.

Several miles of nature trails provide access to the varied landscapes of the refuge. Dogs are permitted only under physical restrictive control of a leash at all times. Hunting is allowed in season (for deer, turkey, and pheasant) with a permit and there are several fishing piers along the lake, which are open outside of the bird migration seasons.

The refuge also documents the area's human history. In 1865, the sternwheel steamboat Bertrand, bound for the Montana Territory, sank in the Missouri River. The boat and its cargo rested on the river bottom until 1968, when the wreck was rediscovered. Over 500,000 items were excavated from the wreck; many of them were in excellent condition. Catalogue numbers are now in the upper 5000's, each number sometimes only having one related object, or, in the case of nails, tens of thousands. A visitor center in the refuge displays many of these items.  The Bertrand site is listed on the National Register of Historic Places.

DeSoto National Wildlife Refuge is located 5 miles (8 km) east of Blair, Nebraska. Access to the refuge is on U.S. Route 30 between Blair and Interstate 29.

See also 
 Boyer Chute National Wildlife Refuge
 Fort Atkinson State Historic Park

References

External links 

 Official DeSoto National Wildlife Refuge website
 Recreation.gov: DeSoto NWR
 Friends of Boyer Chute and DeSoto National Wildlife Refuges

National Wildlife Refuges in Iowa
National Wildlife Refuges in Nebraska
Missouri River
Protected areas of Harrison County, Iowa
Protected areas of Pottawattamie County, Iowa
Protected areas of Washington County, Nebraska
Border irregularities of the United States
1958 establishments in Iowa
1958 establishments in Nebraska
Protected areas established in 1958